Hasay is a surname. Notable people with the surname include:

George Hasay (born 1948), American politician
Jordan Hasay (born 1991), American middle-distance runner